René Schietse (11 July 1889 – 6 January 1955) was a Belgian footballer. He played in two matches for the Belgium national football team from 1911 to 1914.

References

External links
 

1889 births
1955 deaths
Belgian footballers
Belgium international footballers
Place of birth missing
Association football midfielders